The Real Property Act 1845 (8 & 9 Vict c 106) was an act of the Parliament of the United Kingdom, which regulated the transfer of land by sale.

Content
Section 3 of the act stated that "a lease required by law to be in writing ... shall be void at law unless also made by deed".

Section 5 reversed a common law rule that a person could not take an immediate interest in land unless named in an indenture under seal.

Section 6 stated that contingent interests were entirely alienable.

Conveyance of Real Property Act 1845
The Act 8 & 9 Vict c 119, sometimes called the Conveyance of Real Property Act 1845, was an act of the Parliament of the United Kingdom.

See also
English land law

Notes

United Kingdom Acts of Parliament 1845
English property law